Hershkind House is a historic home located at Poughkeepsie, Dutchess County, New York.  It was built about 1885 and is a -story, five-bay-wide Swiss chalet–style dwelling with a steeply pitched roof.  It features a three-sided bay with a four-sided conical roof with "V" shaped cutouts.  It also has board-and-batten and clapboard siding, pierced balcony railings, and a stick style porch.

It was added to the National Register of Historic Places in 1982.

References

Houses on the National Register of Historic Places in New York (state)
Houses completed in 1885
Houses in Poughkeepsie, New York
National Register of Historic Places in Poughkeepsie, New York